Dinah! is a fourth studio album by blues, R&B and jazz singer Dinah Washington released on the EmArcy label. The album includes a mix of  jazz, popular and blues standards of the period, all selected to emphasize the vocalist's style.

Reception 
Allmusic details the album in its review as saying:

The single "Make Me a Present of You" peaked at #27 on the Billboard Hot R&B Sides chart in 1958.

Track listing 

Additional tracks on later releases
"What Is This Thing Called Love?"
Cole Porter (lyrics and music) – 6:45
"The Show Must Go On"
Albert Frisch (music); Roy Alfred (words) – 2:27
"The Birth of the Blues"
Ray Henderson (music); Buddy G. DeSylva, Lew Brown (lyrics) – 3:56

Notes
 – Recorded January 12, 1955 in New York.
 – November 10, 1955 in Los Angeles.
 – November 11, 1955 in Los Angeles.
 – November 12, 1955 in Los Angeles.

Selected re-issues and compilations 

 Re-issues

Dinah!
PolyGram (CD) (©1991)
New program notes by James Isaacs (of WBUR-FM)

Compilations

The Complete Dinah Washington on Mercury
 CD 2 of 3
 Vol. 4 of 7
 Tokyo: Manufactured and distributed by Nippon Phonogram Co.
 Remaster of Mercury 834683-2
 Kiyoshi Tokiwa (born 1936), digital remastering

Personnel 
Adapted from AllMusic.

 Georgie Auld – tenor saxophone
 Keter Betts – bass
 Jimmy Cobb – drums
 Maynard Ferguson – trumpet
 Tom Ferguson – trumpet
 Herb Geller – alto saxophone
 Conrad Gozzo – trumpet
 Al Hendrickson – guitar
 Arthur "Skeets" Herfurt – alto saxophone
 James Isaacs – liner notes
 Wynton Kelly – piano
 Tokiwa Kinoshita – digital remastering, remastering
 Manny Klein – trumpet
 Ray Linn – trumpet
 Hal Mooney – arranger, conductor
 Hal Mooney Orchestra – musician
 Ben Mundy – preparation for release
 Tom Pederson – trombone
 Cliff Preiss – preparation for release
 Frank Rosolino – trombone
 Babe Russin – tenor saxophone
 Bob Shad – producer
 Dinah Washington – vocals
 Si Zentner – trombone

Notes

References

Dinah Washington albums
1956 albums
EmArcy Records albums
Albums produced by Bob Shad
Albums arranged by Hal Mooney
Albums conducted by Hal Mooney